The Bank of Scotland plc (Scottish Gaelic: Banca na h-Alba) is a commercial and clearing bank based in Scotland and is part of the Lloyds Banking Group. The bank was established by the Parliament of Scotland in 1695 to develop Scotland's trade with other countries, and aimed to create a stable banking system in the Kingdom of Scotland.

With a history dating to the end of the 17th century, it is the fifth-oldest extant bank in the United Kingdom (the Bank of England having been established one year earlier), and is the only commercial institution created by the Parliament of Scotland to remain in existence. It was one of the first banks in Europe to print its own banknotes, and it continues to print its own sterling banknotes under legal arrangements that allow Scottish banks to issue currency.

In June 2006, the HBOS Group Reorganisation Act 2006 was passed by the Parliament of the United Kingdom, allowing the bank's structure to be simplified. As a result, The Governor and Company of the Bank of Scotland became Bank of Scotland plc on 17 September 2007. Bank of Scotland has been a subsidiary of Lloyds Banking Group since 19 January 2009, when HBOS was acquired by Lloyds TSB.

History

Establishment

The Governor and Company of the Bank of Scotland was established by an Act of the Parliament of Scotland on 17 July 1695, the Act for erecting a Bank in Scotland, opening for business in February 1696. Although established soon after the Bank of England (1694), the Bank of Scotland was a very different institution. Whereas the Bank of England was established specifically to finance defence spending by the English government, the Bank of Scotland was established by the Scottish government to support Scottish business, and was prohibited from lending to the government without parliamentary approval. The founding Act granted the bank a monopoly on public banking in Scotland for 21 years, permitted the bank's directors to raise a nominal capital of £1,200,000 pound Scots (£100,000 pound sterling), gave the proprietors (shareholders) limited liability, and in the final clause (repealed only in 1920) made all foreign-born proprietors naturalised Scotsmen "to all Intents and Purposes whatsoever". John Holland, an Englishman, was one of the bank's founders. Its first chief accountant was George Watson.

18th and 19th centuries

The Bank of Scotland was suspected of Jacobite sympathies. Its first rival, the Royal Bank of Scotland, was formed by royal charter in 1727. This led to a period of great competition between the two banks as they tried to drive each other out of business. Although the "Bank Wars" ended in around 1751, competition soon arose from other sources, as other Scottish banks were founded throughout the country. In response, the Bank of Scotland itself began to open branches throughout Scotland. 

Following the Acts of Union in 1707, the bank supervised the reminting of the old Scottish coinage into Sterling. It was one of the first banks in Europe to print its own banknotes, and it continues to print its own sterling banknotes under legal arrangements that allow Scottish banks to issue currency.

The bank also took the lead in establishing the security and stability of the entire Scottish banking system, which became more important after the insolvency of Alexander Fordyce and collapse of the Ayr Bank in 1772, in the crisis following the collapse of the London house of Neal, James, Fordyce and Down. 

Henry Dundas was Governor of the Bank of Scotland from 1790 to 1811. As well as governor, he was also Home Secretary in William Pitt the Younger's government. In 1792, Dundas was successful in passing the Slave Trade Bill in the House of Commons.

The bank was housed in the southern (1588) section of the Gourlay house on Melbourne Place before being moved to the customised bank building on the Mound in 1805.

The Western Bank collapsed in 1857, and the Bank of Scotland stepped in with the other Scottish banks to ensure that all the Western Bank's notes were paid. The first branch in London opened in 1865.

20th century
In the 1950s, the Bank of Scotland was involved in several mergers and acquisitions with different banks. In 1955, the Bank merged with the Union Bank of Scotland. The Bank also expanded into consumer credit with the purchase of Chester-based, North West Securities (Later Capital Bank). In 1971, the Bank agreed to merge with the British Linen Bank, owned by Barclays Bank. The merger saw Barclays Bank acquire a 35% stake in the Bank of Scotland, a stake it retained until the 1990s.

In 1959, the Bank of Scotland became the first bank in the UK to install a computer to process accounts centrally. At 11:00 on 25 January 1985, the Bank of Scotland introduced HOBS (Home and Office Banking Services), an early example of remote access technology being made available to banking customers. This followed a small-scale service operated jointly with the Nottingham Building Society for two years but developed by the Bank of Scotland. The new HOBS service enabled customers to access their accounts directly on a television screen, using the Prestel telephone network.

International expansion

The arrival of North Sea oil to Scotland in the 1970s allowed the Bank of Scotland to expand into the energy sector. The Bank later used this expertise in energy finance to expand internationally. The first international office opened in Houston, Texas, followed by more in the United States, Moscow and Singapore. In 1987, the Bank acquired Countrywide Bank of New Zealand (later sold to Lloyds TSB in 1998). The Bank later expanded into the Australian market by acquiring the Perth-based Bank of Western Australia.

A controversial period in the Bank's history was the attempt in 1999 to enter the United States retail banking market via a joint venture with evangelist Pat Robertson. The move was met with criticism from civil rights groups in the UK, owing to Robertson's controversial views on homosexuality. The Bank was forced to cancel the deal when Robertson described Scotland as a "dark land overrun by homosexuals".

HBOS

Formation of HBOS

In the late 1990s, the UK financial sector market underwent a period of consolidation on a large scale. Many of the large building societies were demutualising and becoming banks in their own right or merging with existing banks. For instance Lloyds Bank and TSB Bank merged in 1995 to create Lloyds TSB. In 1999, the Bank of Scotland made a takeover bid for National Westminster Bank. Since the Bank of Scotland was significantly smaller than the English-based NatWest, the move was seen as an audacious and risky move. However, The Royal Bank of Scotland tabled a rival offer, and a bitter takeover battle ensued, with the Royal Bank the victor.

The Bank of Scotland was now the centre of other merger opportunities. A proposal to merge with the Abbey National was explored, but later rejected. In 2001, the Bank of Scotland and the Halifax agreed a merger to form HBOS ("Halifax Bank of Scotland").

HBOS Reorganisation Act

In 2006, HBOS secured the passing of the HBOS Group Reorganisation Act 2006, a private Act of Parliament that would allow the group to operate within a simplified structure. The Act allowed HBOS to make the Governor and Company of the Bank of Scotland a public limited company, Bank of Scotland plc, which became the principal banking subsidiary of HBOS. Halifax plc and Capital Bank plc transferred their undertakings to Bank of Scotland plc, and although the Halifax brand name was retained, Halifax then began to operate under the latter company's UK banking licence. Capital Bank branding was phased out.

The provisions in the Act were implemented on 17 September 2007.

Lloyds Banking Group

Following the implosion of the Bank of Scotland in 2008, HBOS Group agreed to be taken over by Lloyds TSB Group.

Banknotes 

Although the Bank of Scotland today is not a central bank, it retains the right (along with two other Scottish commercial banks) to issue pound sterling banknotes to this day. These notes are equal in value to notes issued by the Bank of England, the central bank of the United Kingdom.

Banknote history
Along with the Bank of England, the Bank of Scotland was one of the first European banks to issue paper currency redeemable for cash on demand (which was an extremely useful facility given the poor state of the Scottish coinage at the end of the 17th century) on a sustainable basis after the earlier failed attempt of the Swedish Stockholms Banco in 1661–64. Following the Acts of Union in 1707, the bank supervised the reminting of the old Scottish coinage into Sterling. Up until the middle of the 19th century, privately owned banks in Great Britain and Ireland were permitted to issue their own banknotes, and money issued by provincial Scottish, English, Welsh and Irish banking companies circulated freely as a means of payment.

In 1826, there was outrage in Scotland at the attempt of the United Kingdom Parliament to prevent the production of banknotes of less than five pounds face value. Sir Walter Scott wrote a series of letters to the Edinburgh Weekly Journal under the pseudonym "Malachi Malagrowther", which provoked such a response that the government was forced to relent and allow the Scottish banks to continue printing £1 notes.

1995 series

Bank of Scotland's previous note issue was in 1995, known as the Tercentenary Series as they were issued in the year of the three hundredth anniversary of the foundation of the bank. Each denomination features Sir Walter Scott on the front, and on the back are representations of industries that Scotland excels in:

 £5 note featuring a vignette of oil and energy
 £10 note featuring a vignette of distilling and brewing
 £20 note featuring a vignette of education and research
 £50 note featuring a vignette of arts and culture
 £100 note featuring a vignette of leisure and tourism.

Few of these notes are still in circulation, although they remain legal currency, and they have been replaced by the 2007 series.

2007 "Bridges" series

Bank of Scotland began issuing a new series of banknotes in the Autumn of 2007, which feature the common theme of Scottish bridges. It will take at least three years for the current issue of Bank of Scotland notes to be phased out of circulation. In keeping with the bank's tradition, the front of the notes depict an image of Sir Walter Scott; the image on the 2007 series is based on the portrait of Scott painted by Henry Raeburn.

Some new security features have also been added to the new design. These include a metallic security thread embedded in every banknote, which contains the numerical value of the note and the note's bridge image. A new hologram and foil patch has been introduced on the front of the £20, £50 and £100 notes, which features the Bank of Scotland logo and the numerical value of the note.

 £5 note features the Brig o' Doon
 £10 note features the Glenfinnan Viaduct
 £20 note features the Forth Bridge
 £50 note features the Falkirk Wheel
 £100 note features the Kessock Bridge

On 1 March 2018 the Bank of Scotland decided to withdraw all of its paper £5 and £10 notes, and fully replace them with its polymer equivalents (see below).

2016 Polymer series
Bank of Scotland began issuing new banknotes on polymer in 2016, beginning with the £5 note. The main theme of the bridges of Scotland are kept for this series, but have been redesigned to incorporate additional design features. The portrait of Sir Walter Scott by Henry Raeburn is the same as the 2007 issues, but have been shifted from the centre to the right side of the notes. The bank's headquarters, "The Mound" is featured at the centre of the note. The size of the notes for this series is also reduced.

 £5 note features Brig o' Doon
 £10 note features Glenfinnan Viaduct
 £20 note features the Forth Bridge and a commemorative £20 note features the Queensferry Crossing
 £50 note features Falkirk Wheel and The Kelpies
 £100 note features Flora Murray

Corporate structure 

Associated brands include:

 Halifax
 Intelligent Finance
 Birmingham Midshires
 Bank of Scotland Corporate 
 Capital Bank 
 Bank of Scotland Investment Services
 Bank of Scotland Private Banking

List of governors of the Bank of Scotland 

 John Holland 1696–1697
 David Melville, 3rd Earl of Leven 1697–1728
 Alexander Hume, 2nd Earl of Marchmont 1728–1740
 Charles Hope, 1st Earl of Hopetoun 1740–1742
 Colonel John Stratton 1742
 John Hay, 4th Marquess of Tweeddale 1742–1762
 Hugh Hume, 3rd Earl of Marchmont 1763–1790
 Henry Dundas, 1st Viscount Melville 1790–1811
 Robert Dundas, 2nd Viscount Melville 1812–1851
 James Broun Ramsay, 1st Marquess of Dalhousie 1851–1860
 John Campbell, 2nd Marquess of Breadalbane 1861–1862
 George Hamilton-Baillie, 11th Earl of Haddington 1863–1870
 John Dalrymple, 10th Earl of Stair 1870–1903
 Alexander Bruce, 6th Lord Balfour of Burleigh 1904–1921
 William Mure 1921–1924
 Sidney Elphinstone, 16th Lord Elphinstone 1924–1955
 Sir John Craig 1955–1957
 Steven Bilsland, 1st Baron Bilsland 1957–1966
 Henry Hepburne-Scott, 10th Lord Polwarth 1966–1972
 Ronald Colville, 2nd Baron Clydesmuir 1972–1981
 Sir Thomas Risk 1981–1991
 Sir Bruce Pattullo 1991–1998
 Sir Alistair Grant 1998–1999
 Sir John Shaw 1999–2001
 Sir Peter Burt 2001–2003
 George Mitchell 2003–2006
 Dennis Stevenson, Baron Stevenson of Coddenham 2006– 2007

Sponsorship 
Bank of Scotland sponsored the Scottish Premier League from its inception in 1998 to season 2006/2007 when it declined to renew the deal in favour of investing in grassroots sport instead. They also sponsored Scottish Athletics for a number of years.

Slavery

Links to the Atlantic Slave Trade
Henry Dundas was Governor of the Bank of Scotland from 1790 to 1811. As well as governor, he was also Home Secretary in William Pitt the Younger's government. In 1792 Dundas was successful in passing the Slave Trade Bill in the House of Commons.

See also 
British banknotes
List of banks
The Royal Bank of Scotland
William Paterson (banker)
Homelink
Museum on the Mound

Notes

External links 

 
History, from the Lloyds Banking Group website
Museum on the Mound Official page of the company's museum

 
Banks of Scotland
Lloyds Banking Group
Companies formerly listed on the London Stock Exchange
Companies based in Edinburgh
Scotland
Banks established in 1695
Scottish brands
1695 establishments in Scotland